Colin McAdam is a Canadian novelist.

Early life and education
McAdam was born in Hong Kong 1971 and grew up in Barbados, Denmark and England, as well as in several cities in Canada.

McAdam studied English and classics at McGill University, located in Montreal, Quebec; and the University of Toronto, Toronto, Ontario.  He received a Doctor of Philosophy degree in English literature from the University of Cambridge, Cambridge, England.  His PhD thesis is a study of translations of Ancient Greek into English in the Seventeenth Century.

Career
McAdam has written for the periodicals Harper's Magazine and The Walrus.

McAdam's first novel, Some Great Thing (2004), won the Books in Canada First Novel Award and was a finalist for the Governor General's Award for English-language fiction, the Rogers Writers' Trust Fiction Prize, the Commonwealth Writers' Prize (Best First Book), and the John Llewellyn Rhys Prize in the United Kingdom.

His second novel, Fall (2009) won the Paragraphe Hugh MacLennan Prize for Fiction, and was shortlisted for the Scotiabank Giller Prize.

His third novel, A Beautiful Truth (2013) won the Rogers Writers' Trust Fiction Prize.

Bibliography
Some Great Thing (2004, Harcourt). .
Fall (2009, Riverhead Books). .
A Beautiful Truth (2013)
Black Dove (2022)

Personal life
McAdam lives in Toronto with poet and former Barzin drummer, Suzanne Hancock. He has two children, one from an earlier marriage.

External links

 McAdam at The Canadian Encyclopedia

References

Year of birth missing (living people)
21st-century Canadian novelists
Hong Kong emigrants to Canada

Alumni of the University of Cambridge
Canadian male novelists
Living people
McGill University alumni
University of Toronto alumni
Writers from Quebec
21st-century Canadian male writers
Amazon.ca First Novel Award winners